Jurica Pavičić (born 2 November 1965 in Split) is a Croatian writer, columnist and film critic.

Pavičić's screenplay for Witnesses (Svjedoci), Vinko Brešan's 2003 film, won the Golden Arena for Best Screenplay in the 2003 Pula Film Festival. The screenplay, co-written with Živko Zalar, is based on Pavičić's debut novel Alabaster Sheep (Ovce od gipsa). His novels and short story collections have been translated to English, German, Italian, French and Bulgarian.

Pavičić was, with Nenad Polimac, one of two Croatian film critics who participated in the British Film Institute's Sight & Sound Greatest Films of All Time poll in 2012.

In 2014, Pavičić received the Croatian Journalists' Association's Journalist of the Year Award.

In 2017, Pavičić has signed the Declaration on the Common Language of the Croats, Serbs, Bosniaks and Montenegrins.


Works

Novels
 Ovce od gipsa (1997)
 Nedjeljni prijatelj (2000)
 Minuta 88 (2002)
 Kuća njene majke (2005)
 Crvenkapica (2006)
 Žena s drugog kata (2015)
 Crvena voda (2017)

Plays
 Trovačica (2000)

Short story collections
 Patrola na cesti (2008)
 Brod u dvorištu (2013)
 Skupljač zmija (2019)

Non-fiction
 Vijesti iz Liliputa (2001)
 Postjugoslavenski film: Stil i ideologija (2011)
 Klasici hrvatskog filma jugoslavenskog razdoblja (2017)
 Knjiga o jugu (2018)

Sources

External links
 
 Jurica Pavičić at booksa.hr 
 Jurica Pavičić at mvinfo.hr 

1965 births
Croatian novelists
Croatian dramatists and playwrights
Croatian male short story writers
Croatian short story writers
Croatian columnists
Croatian screenwriters
Croatian film critics
Golden Arena winners
Writers from Split, Croatia
Faculty of Humanities and Social Sciences, University of Zagreb alumni
Living people
Signatories of the Declaration on the Common Language